The Philippine Human Rights Information Center (PhilRights) is a non-profit, national human rights organization in the Philippines, Manila. PhilRights is the research and information arm of PAHRA and is a research and information institution that provides information, documentation, research and analyses. The main work are the Institutional Programs: Human Rights Research, Human Rights Monitoring and Documentation, Human Rights Information, Human Rights Education and Training.

PhilRights was founded in 1991 by PAHRA.

References

External links
 Philippine Human Rights Information Center (Official Website)

1991 establishments in the Philippines
Human rights organizations based in the Philippines